Clitostethus is a genus of dusky lady beetles in the family Coccinellidae, including over 40 species, many of which were formerly placed under the genus name Nephaspis.

Selected species
 Clitostethus acutisiphonicus Peng, Ren & Pang 1998
 Clitostethus arcuatus (Rossi, 1794)
 Clitostethus bawanglingensis Peng, Ren & Pang 1998
 Clitostethus bicolor (Gordon, 1982)
 Clitostethus brachylobus Peng, Ren & Pang 1998
 Clitostethus cocois (Gordon, 1972)
 Clitostethus convexus (Nunenmacher, 1937)
 Clitostethus dispar Sicard, 1929
 Clitostethus gorhami (Casey, 1899)
 Clitostethus indus (Gordon, 1996)
 Clitostethus oculatus (Blatchley, 1917) (eyed lady)

References

Coccinellidae
Coccinellidae genera